Okage: Shadow King, known in Japan as , is a role-playing video game developed by Zener Works and co-developed and published by Sony Computer Entertainment. It was released on March 15, 2001 in Japan, and October 1, 2001 in North America, exclusively for the PlayStation 2. It was never released in PAL regions until the PlayStation 2 classic lineup for PlayStation 4 was released on March 23, 2016.

Gameplay
In Okage: Shadow King, the player character Ari proceeds through the game by visiting towns, traveling across the overworld and exploring dungeons. The game contains warp pillars that can be used to quick travel to other locations once they have been discovered. 

The combat is similar to that of many role-playing games, with characters having health points (HP) and magic points (MP). Battles generally commence when the player touches an enemy on the overworld. In addition to party members engaging in combat, Ari's shadow Stan, although not playable, may use powerful magic attacks on the enemy. Each fight is turned based, and a character can opt to wait in order to perform a more powerful combo attack with other characters. Characters have innate elements that are visible to the player during battle. This determines the types of spells they learn and what spells are strong against which enemies (for instance, lightning magic is strong against ice characters). If at any time during battle, Ari is defeated, it is game over, and the player must return to their last save.

Plot

Story
The story stars a quiet, 16 year old boy named Ari who lived a peaceful life in the town of Tenel until one day his grandfather comes to his house with an ancient bottle, and to save his sister from a curse inflicted to her by a ghost, they perform a ritual summoning an ancient evil, Lord Stanley Hihat Trinidad XIV, or "Stan" for short, who merges with Ari's shadow. They then embark on a journey to defeat the fake Evil Kings who stole Stan's powers and take over the world.

Characters
: The main protagonist of the game. A quiet, 16-year-old boy with an overshadowed destiny. His shadow is so thin, that most people ignore him and it is what enables Stan to take him as his slave. Seems to be without note, but he reluctantly takes on the responsibility of being enslaved by the Evil King Stan in order to save his sister from the ghost's curse—and once that's done, to save the world from the Fake Evil Kings and restore Stan's true power. In the beginning of the story, his weapon is a branch. He obtains a sword, which is upgradable, as he progresses through the game. In the Japanese version, his eyes are wide open. They were toned down in the US version.
, better known as Evil King Stan, or just Stan, possesses Ari's shadow to appear in this world. He is short-tempered and has a childish personality, but has moments where he picks up on things that even the other group members miss. He has built his identity on being evil and desires to be feared by the world as the Great Evil King. He claims to be the reincarnation of, and therefore the heir to, the Great Evil King Gohma, who was defeated by the Great Hero Hopkins three hundred years previous to the story. Hopkins also sealed Stan away into a bottle, which is found by Ari's father.
 is the cheerful ghost butler to the Evil King Stan. He is seen quite a few times in the game, mostly with just info on things you should know about, but he is often too preoccupied with something (or someone) else to follow his "almighty" master's orders.
 is a 22-year-old heroine, a master of the rapier and the reluctant devotee of the parasol. She and Stan have a history of conflict which began upon releasing him from his bottle three years previous to the game's beginning; Stan took over her shadow for just long enough to insult her figure and her to threaten to kill herself (thus killing him), before he retreated back into the bottle.Rosalyn used to be an elite hero and was at the top of her class, but ever since her shadow became pink she has been a laughing stock and forced to hide her shameful shadow under a parasol. She never forgave Stan for this mockery and has been hunting for him since. She feels she needs to prove her strength and skill as an expert swordswoman and caster of spells. She is also a magnet for ghosts.
: As a spoiled princess, she is snobbish and pompous before truly getting to know Ari and his family. Later in the game the player finds out that the Marlene they know is actually a doll, and that the real Marlene's body is trapped elsewhere in the world of her father's creation. She also seems to be Ari's love interest, as they are seen holding hands in the ending.
: An extremely eccentric scientist who has devoted his life to the ghost research, while enjoying such hobbies as stalking pretty girls and collecting toenail clippings.  Upon meeting the party, he is enticed by Rosalyn's ability to attract ghosts and joins the quest without a single party member's approval. Despite his behavior, the 45-year-old Kisling seems to be quite intelligent, and he wields powerful offensive magic.
: Formerly the "Big Bull Evil King", a fighter with great physical strength who loves exercise and battle.  He excitedly joins Ari's party to help defeat the other evil kings after he, himself, is defeated. His dream is to someday open his own athletic gym. His idiotic and unwitting personality disagrees with Rosalyn and Stan but he's too cheerful and loving of the party to notice or care. He has a crush on Linda.
: She is an aspiring singer from Madril who unfortunately lacks talent so later uses Stan's stolen power to become the "Teen Idol Evil King" and loved by her brainwashed fans. Though she is somewhat subdued when Ari first meets her, after she joins the party her truly cheery and very bubbly personality comes out. initially, she seemed to have a crush on Ari, but it is later discovered that she actually had a crush on Stan who just happened to have the "dorky" "doll", Ari, attached to him. Further down the line, Linda's crush on Stan seems to fade in favor of one blossoming for the reluctant Epros. She attacks using her microphone as a weapon and supports the party with magical chants.
: Using Stan's power, he is known as the "Phantom Evil King" and throws playing cards and casts magic to attack his enemies. He is sophisticated and well dressed, though his interests in magic and the "truth" of the world, as well as his ability to float about and his strange speech pattern make him as peculiar as the rest of the cast.  He always speaks in rhyme and with Shakespearean words, which confuses the team and annoys Stan to no end. Like the other "Evil King" party members, Epros joins the group after he is defeated, late in the game. Epros is the main love interest of Linda, but only after she gets over Stan.

Development and release

Okage: Shadow King was co-developed by Zener Works and Sony Computer Entertainment, the latter of which was also the game's publisher. Programmer Yasushi Takeda, one the founders Zener Works, recalled that the company was producing a game for the Panasonic M2 prior to the system's cancellation. Sony contacted them in June 1997 about making a game for the original PlayStation.  Okage thus began development but the project was moved to the PlayStation 2 when Sony requested Zener Works do so the day before it announced its next-generation console on March 1, 1999. All the graphics and coding was redone while the number programs was doubled due to the newer console's Emotion Engine. Takeda stated that debugging was a challenge due to the company working with the console in an early state and the absence of such tools.

The Okage: Shadow King soundtrack was released on July 17, 2001 in Japan only. The soundtrack was composed by a band known as peak a soul+, consisting of Jun-Ichi Doi, Takimitsu Kajikawa, Yoshikazu Kawatani, Yasutaka Kume, Toshiaki Murata, and Kazuhide Toda. The ending song "Higher Breath" was sung by Yurica Nagasawa. The soundtrack also refers to Boku to Maō as "Me and Satan King".

As well as the soundtrack, figures based on Okage have been released. The six-figure set includes Ari and Stan, Rosalyn, James, Marlene, Big Bull, and Linda. It included the three ghost types featured in the game, as well as Gears so that the characters can stand straight. There was also a promotional contest for a can opener shaped like Stan, very few images of the actual can opener exist however. An official Strategy guide was also published (this version is much different than its North American counterpart). All of these were only available in Japan. In North America, Prima Games published the strategy guide.

Reception

The PlayStation 2 version received "average" reviews according to the review aggregation website Metacritic. In Japan, Famitsu gave it a score of 30 out of 40.

References

External links
Official website

2001 video games
Cancelled PlayStation (console) games
PlayStation 2 games
PlayStation 2-only games
Role-playing video games
Sony Interactive Entertainment games
Video games developed in Japan